is a Japanese artistic gymnast.

Competitive history

Detailed results

See also 
 Japan men's national gymnastics team

References

External links 
 Tsuyoshi Hasegawa

Japanese male artistic gymnasts
Sportspeople from Hyōgo Prefecture
Living people
2001 births
21st-century Japanese people